Edwin Earle Honey (May 2, 1891 – October 31, 1956) was an American plant pathologist and mycologist. In 1936, he formally described the fungus and plant pathogen Monilinia azaleae, which preys upon crops and other plants in the families Rosaceae and Ericaceae.

Honey was born in Illinois. He was married first to Mary Luella Trowbridge (1894–1941), and later to Mrs. Ruth R. Honey.

In 1920 Honey lived in Champaign, Illinois; and in 1935 he lived in Madison, Wisconsin. Depending on where he was employed, Honey also lived for times in Shorewood, Wisconsin, Philadelphia, and New York state.

Honey received his B.S. degree in plant pathology from Cornell University in 1916, and was a member of the Sigma Xi (ΣΞ), an international honor society for scholars in fields of science or engineering.

Starting in 1948, and until his death in 1956, Honey was a plant pathologist in the Extension Division of Pennsylvania State University. He is buried in Centre County Memorial Park in State College, Pennsylvania.

Bibliography
Honey published professionally under the names Edwin E. Honey or E. E. Honey. This is a partial list of his writings:

Books

Journal articles

References

External links
 

American phytopathologists
American mycologists
American botanists
People from Champaign, Illinois
Cornell University College of Agriculture and Life Sciences alumni
1891 births
1956 deaths
20th-century agronomists